Anže Tavčar (born 2 December 1994) is a Slovenian competitive swimmer, who specializes in sprint freestyle events. At the 2016 Summer Olympics he competed in the men's 100 meter freestyle and men's 200 meter freestyle. His career's most notable performance remains 100 meters freestyle at the 2016 LEN European Aquatics Championships where he, with the time of 0:48.88, became the first Slovenian swimmer as well as the first Indiana Hoosier to break the 49 second barrier.

Tavčar enrolled at the University of Louisville School of Dentistry in 2018 and is scheduled to receive his degree in May 2022.

References

External links
 

1994 births
Living people
Indiana Hoosiers men's swimmers
Slovenian male swimmers
Olympic swimmers of Slovenia
Swimmers at the 2016 Summer Olympics
Place of birth missing (living people)
University of Louisville School of Dentistry alumni